Richard Carl Tomanek (born January 6, 1931) is an American former professional baseball player, a pitcher who played for five seasons in Major League Baseball. He played for the Cleveland Indians from 1953 to 1954 and 1957 to 1958 and the Kansas City Athletics from 1958 to 1959.

External links

1931 births
Living people
Major League Baseball pitchers
Cleveland Indians players
Kansas City Athletics players
Baseball players from Ohio
People from Avon Lake, Ohio
Pittsfield Indians players
Reading Indians players
Indianapolis Indians players
Dallas Rangers players